Below is the list of populated places in Osmaniye Province, Turkey by the districts. In the following lists first place in each list is the administrative center of the district.

Osmaniye 

Osmaniye
Akyar, Osmaniye
Alahanlı, Osmaniye
Arslanlı, Osmaniye
Bahçe, Osmaniye
Cevdetiye, Osmaniye
Çağşak, Osmaniye
Çardak, Osmaniye
Çona, Osmaniye
Değirmenocağı, Osmaniye
Dereli, Osmaniye
Dereobası, Osmaniye
Dervişli, Osmaniye
Gökçedam, Osmaniye
Issızca, Osmaniye
Karacalar, Osmaniye
Karataş, Osmaniye
Kayalı, Osmaniye
Kazmaca, Osmaniye
Kesmeburun, Osmaniye
Kırıklı, Osmaniye
Kırmacılı, Osmaniye
Kırmıtlı, Osmaniye
Koçyurdu, Osmaniye
Köyyeri, Osmaniye
Kumarlı, Osmaniye
Küllü, Osmaniye
Nohuttepe, Osmaniye
Orhaniye, Osmaniye
Oruçgazi, Osmaniye
Sakarcalık, Osmaniye
Sarpınağzı, Osmaniye
Selimiye, Osmaniye
Serdar, Osmaniye
Serinova, Osmaniye
Şekerdere, Osmaniye
Tehçi, Osmaniye
Yarpuz, Osmaniye
Yeniköy, Osmaniye

Bahçe 

Bahçe
Arıcaklı, Bahçe
Arıklıkaş, Bahçe
Aşağıarıcaklı, Bahçe
Aşağıkardere, Bahçe
Bekdemir, Bahçe
Burgaçlı, Bahçe
Gökmustafalı, Bahçe
İnderesi, Bahçe
Kaman, Bahçe
Kızlaç, Bahçe
Nohut, Bahçe
Örencik, Bahçe
Savranlı, Bahçe
Yaylalık, Bahçe
Yukarıkardere, Bahçe

Düziçi 

Düziçi
Akçakoyunlu, Düziçi
Alibozlu, Düziçi
Atalan, Düziçi
Bayındırlı, Düziçi
Bostanlar, Düziçi
Böcekli, Düziçi
Çamiçi, Düziçi
Çatak, Düziçi
Çerçioğlu, Düziçi
Çitli, Düziçi
Çotlu, Düziçi
Elbeyli, Düziçi
Ellek, Düziçi
Farsak, Düziçi
Gökçayır, Düziçi
Gümüş, Düziçi
Güzelyurt, Düziçi
Karagedik, Düziçi
Karaguz, Düziçi
Kuşcu, Düziçi
Oluklu, Düziçi
Pirsultanlı, Düziçi
Selverler, Düziçi
Söğütlügöl, Düziçi
Yarbaşı, Düziçi
Yazlamazlı, Düziçi
Yenifarsak, Düziçi
Yeşildere, Düziçi
Yeşilköy, Düziçi
Yeşilyurt, Düziçi

Hasanbeyli 

Hasanbeyli
Çolaklı, Hasanbeyli
Çulhalı, Hasanbeyli
Kalecik, Hasanbeyli
Karayiğit, Hasanbeyli
Sarayova, Hasanbeyli
Yanıkkışla, Hasanbeyli

Kadirli 

Kadirli
Akköprü, Kadirli
Akova, Kadirli
Anberinarkı, Kadirli
Aşağıbozkuyu, Kadirli
Aşağıçiyanlı, Kadirli
Aydınlar, Kadirli
Azaplı, Kadirli
Bahadırlı, Kadirli
Bekereci, Kadirli
Coşkunlar, Kadirli
Çaygeçit, Kadirli
Çığcık, Kadirli
Çınar, Kadirli
Çiğdemli, Kadirli
Çukurköprü, Kadirli
Değirmendere, Kadirli
Durmuşsofular, Kadirli
Erdoğdu, Kadirli
Göztaşı, Kadirli
Hacıhaliloğlu, Kadirli
Halitağalar, Kadirli
Hardallık, Kadirli
Harkaştığı, Kadirli
İlbistanlı, Kadirli
Kabayar, Kadirli
Karabacak, Kadirli
Karakütük, Kadirli
Karatepe, Kadirli
Kayasuyu, Kadirli
Kerimli, Kadirli
Kesikkeli, Kadirli
Kesim, Kadirli
Kızyusuflu, Kadirli
Kiremitli, Kadirli
Koçlu, Kadirli
Kösepınarı, Kadirli
Kümbet, Kadirli
Mecidiye, Kadirli
Mehedinli, Kadirli
Mezretli, Kadirli
Narlıkışla, Kadirli
Oruçbey, Kadirli
Öksüzlü, Kadirli
Sarıtanışmanlı, Kadirli
Sofular, Kadirli
Söğütlüdere, Kadirli
Şabaplı, Kadirli
Tahta, Kadirli
Tatarlı, Kadirli
Tekeli, Kadirli
Topraktepe, Kadirli
Tozlu, Kadirli
Vayvaylı, Kadirli
Yalnızdut, Kadirli
Yenigün, Kadirli
Yeniköy, Kadirli
Yoğunoluk, Kadirli
Yukarıbozkuyu, Kadirli
Yukarıçiyanlı, Kadirli
Yusufizzettin, Kadirli

Sumbas 

Sumbas
Akçataş, Sumbas
Akdam, Sumbas
Alibeyli, Sumbas
Armağanlı, Sumbas
Çiçeklidere, Sumbas
Esenli, Sumbas
Gafarlı, Sumbas
Hüyük, Sumbas
Kızılömerli, Sumbas
Köseli, Sumbas
Küçükçınar, Sumbas
Mehmetli, Sumbas
Reşadiye, Sumbas
Yazıboyu, Sumbas
Yeşilyayla, Sumbas

Toprakkale 

Toprakkale
Arslanpınarı, Toprakkale	
Büyüktüysüz, Toprakkale	
Lalegölü, Toprakkale	
Sazlık, Toprakkale	
Sayhüyük, Toprakkale	
Tüysüz, Toprakkale

References 

Osmaniye Province
Mediterranean Region, Turkey
Osmaniye
List